General elections were held in Sudan to elect a President and National Assembly between 2 and 17 March 1996. They were the first elections since 1986 due to a military coup in 1989, and the first simultaneous elections for the presidency and National Assembly. 125 members of the 400-seat National Assembly had been nominated before the election, leaving 275 seats to be elected (of which 51 were ultimately uncontested). 900 candidates ran for the 275 seats. There were no political parties at the time, and all candidates ran as independents.

In the presidential election, 40 candidates ran against incumbent Omar al-Bashir, who emerged victorious with 75.4% of the vote.  Opposition groups boycotted the elections, claiming they were unfair. Because of the civil war, no voting took place in 11 Southern districts.

Voter turnout was reported to be 72%.

Results

President

National Assembly

References

Sudan
General election
Elections in Sudan
Non-partisan elections
National Legislature (Sudan)
Presidential elections in Sudan
Election and referendum articles with incomplete results